Winds of Change is the seventh album by Jefferson Starship and was released in 1982. It was the first studio album produced after Grace Slick rejoined the band as a full member. Aynsley Dunbar plays drums on the album, but was replaced by Donny Baldwin for the supporting tour. The album reached number 26 on the Billboard charts.

Cash Box called the title track "concisely crafted" and called the song a return to Jefferson Airplane's style.

The LP produced two U.S. Top 40 singles:  "Be My Lady" in the fall of 1982 (#28), and "Winds of Change" in the winter of 1983 (#38).

Track listing

Personnel
Mickey Thomas – lead (1-4, 6, 9) and backing vocals
Grace Slick – lead (1, 5, 7, 9) and backing vocals
Paul Kantner – lead (8) and backing vocals, rhythm guitar
Craig Chaquico – lead guitar, rhythm guitar
David Freiberg – vocals, bass (3), keyboards (1, 2, 5, 6, 8), organ on (9), synthesizer (9)
Pete Sears – bass (1, 2, 4-9), keyboards (3, 4), synthesizer (7, 9), piano (3, 8)
Aynsley Dunbar – drums, percussion

Production
Kevin Beamish – producer for Kevin Beamish Productions, Inc., engineer
Maureen Droney – assistant engineer
Tom Cummings – assistant mixing engineer
Jeff Sanders – mastering
Pat Ieraci (Maurice) – production coordinator
Andreas Nottebohm – cover art, painting
Dyer / Kahn, Inc. – design
Paul Tokarski, Visual Promotions, Inc. – special effects photography
Recorded at The Automatt, San Francisco
Mixed and mastered at Kendun Recorders, Burbank
Bill Thompson – manager

Singles and music videos
"Be My Lady" (1982) #28 US
"Winds of Change" (1983) #38 US Billboard Hot 100; #37 Cash Box Top 100
"Can't Find Love" (1983)
"Out of Control" (music video only / no single released)

Notes

References

Jefferson Starship albums
1982 albums
Grunt Records albums
Albums produced by Kevin Beamish